Spiro Debarski (born 8 December 1933 in Blagoevgrad) is a former Bulgarian footballer who competed in the 1960 Summer Olympics.

Honours

Club
Lokomotiv Sofia
 A Group: 1963–64

References

External links

1933 births
Living people
Bulgarian footballers
Bulgaria international footballers
Olympic footballers of Bulgaria
Footballers at the 1960 Summer Olympics
OFC Pirin Blagoevgrad players
FC Lokomotiv 1929 Sofia players
First Professional Football League (Bulgaria) players
Nea Salamis Famagusta FC managers
Bulgarian expatriate sportspeople in Cyprus
Macedonian Bulgarians
Sportspeople from Blagoevgrad
Bulgarian football managers
FC Yantra Gabrovo managers
Association football forwards